Frédéric-Hector Daigneault (May 19, 1860 – February 26, 1933) was a Canadian provincial politician.

Born in Chambly, Canada East, Daigneault was a member of the Municipal Council for Acton Vale, Quebec for 10 years. He was mayor from 1905 to 1914 and from 1916 to 1918. He was the Liberal member of the Legislative Assembly of Quebec for Bagot from 1900 to 1913.

References

1860 births
1933 deaths
Mayors of places in Quebec
People from Chambly, Quebec
Quebec Liberal Party MNAs